The Universal Connector was a standard port fitted to the bottom of many Palm PDA's from 2001 to 2004 and on units from other manufacturers that licensed Palm technology, including Garmin.

Out of the box, it is used to connect to the sync and charge cradle, allowing the Palm to connect to a desktop PC and receive battery power. A range of accessories were also available for the Universal Connector, including folding keyboards, external battery packs, wired and wireless modems, and many more.

The Universal Connector cradles were the first synchronization device that used USB to communicate with the host computer, in addition to the older serial port standard.

Some Palm devices manufactured between 2001 and 2004 did not use the Universal Connector.  For instance, the Tungsten E had a mini-USB connector.

The Universal Connector was superseded by the Palm Multi-Connector for the final devices released by Palm, this standard added stereo audio output and mono microphone input.

Palm Models fitted with the Universal Connector 
 m125, m130
 m500, m505, m515
 Palm i705
 Zire 71
 Tungsten T, T2, T3, C, W

Garmin Models fitted with the Universal Connector 
 Garmin iQue 3600, 3200

External links 
 Palm Universal connector pinout

Palm OS devices